John Salazar (born 4 March 1965) is a Colombian former weightlifter. He competed in the men's featherweight event at the 1988 Summer Olympics.

References

External links
 

1965 births
Living people
Colombian male weightlifters
Olympic weightlifters of Colombia
Weightlifters at the 1988 Summer Olympics
Central American and Caribbean Games medalists in weightlifting
Place of birth missing (living people)
20th-century Colombian people
21st-century Colombian people
Pan American Games medalists in weightlifting
Pan American Games bronze medalists for Colombia
Medalists at the 1991 Pan American Games
Weightlifters at the 1991 Pan American Games